Boowelikada is a village under Udunuwara AGA division in central province of Kandy District, Sri Lanka.

Populated places in Kandy District